Individual is a person or any specific object in a group of things.

Individual, Individualism or Individuality may also refer to:

Social philosophy
Individualism,  a moral, political, or social outlook, that stresses human independence and the importance of individual self-reliance and liberty
The Individual, the journal of the Society for Individual Freedom
Individual rights, liberal concept of rights distinct from civil rights, legal rights, and group rights
Individual capacity, in law, one's status as a natural person, distinct from any other role
Atomism (social), the belief that society should be viewed in terms of the individual's importance and that society is artificially constructed

Methodology
Methodological individualism, a philosophical method aimed at explaining and understanding broad society
Individualist anarchism, holds that individual conscience and the pursuit of self-interest should not be constrained by any collective body or public authority
Individualist feminism, also known as libertarian feminism or ifeminism

Music
Individuals (album), a 1982 album by Sunnyboys
The Individualist, 1995 album by Todd Rundgren, under the pseudonym "TR-i"
Individual, 2018 EP by Niki & Gabi
Individual Tour, 2018 concert tour by Niki & Gabi
"Individual", a song on Stranger Than Fiction, 1994 album by Bad Religion 
"The Individual", a song on Ladies and Gentlemen We Are Floating in Space, 1997 album by Spiritualized
"Individuality", a song on Scam, 2000 album by The Screaming Jets

Other
Individual Computers, German retrocomputing hardware company
Individual sport, as opposed to a team sport